Safe House is a 1998 American independent thriller film directed by Eric Steven Stahl and starring Patrick Stewart, Kimberly Williams, and Héctor Elizondo. It premiered in the United Kingdom in late 1998 on Channel 5 and in the United States on Showtime on January 24, 1999.

Plot
Mace Sowell is a retired DIA agent who believes his life is in danger from his former boss, Admiral Thomas Michelmore, who is now running for President of the United States. Mace has information about the underhand dealings of his erstwhile boss at the DIA which would ruin his Presidential campaign if it ever was released into the public domain. The information is located in cyberspace and is scheduled to be sent to every major newspaper in the western world unless Mace reprograms the mail server remotely from his computer every 24 hours using a special password only he knows. To complicate the issue, Mace is in the early stages of Alzheimer's disease and has difficulty in convincing people his information is not paranoia as a result of his condition. He only leaves his home in disguise and visits his psychiatrist Dr. Simon under duress from his daughter Michelle, who threatens to have his mental competency evaluated. Because Mace never discussed his career in the DIA with his family and also because paranoia is a common symptom of Alzheimer's disease, Mace is unable to convince Simon or Michelle of the truth of the threat he faces. Simon suggests to Michelle that she either hire an in-home caregiver for Mace or have him committed if his behavior becomes too much to handle. Following a difficult search, Michelle hires Andi Travers, whom Mace is immediately hostile toward. Their relationship is fraught at first as she tries to convert Mace to a macrobiotic diet, and Andi in turn is angered by Mace's invasion of her privacy as part of his background check, which arouses no suspicion.

Mace has few friends apart from Stu, a man who cleans his pool and does other odd jobs for him. Stu tells Andi that he has known Mace since before the onset of his mental degeneration. Amongst the jobs Stu carries out for Mace are drills — training exercises whereby Stu dresses up in quasi-military gear and balaclavas and simulates breaking into Mace's house and attacking him. Stu does this more out of friendship and lack of anything better to do than because he believes Mace's claims about being under threat. During one such drill, Andi mistakes Stu for a genuine burglar and severely injures him with a golf club. Andi earns Mace's gratitude by covering the incident from Michelle during a phone call. Although Mace and Andi begin to get along, Mace strains Michelle's patience when he stages a car bomb removal in her van, and she disallows further drills. After Mace accuses Andi and Stu of conspiring against him in abiding by this request, they attempt to cheer Mace up with a final drill, but his subpar performance seems to prove that he is no longer able to fend for himself.

Mace allows himself to be more dependent on Andi, but does not let go of the notion that Michelmore is making an attempt on his life, which results in him shooting at a neighbor's incoming car. This incident convinces Michelle to remove all weapons from Mace's home and to file a competency hearing. Faced with commitment, Mace reveals to Andi his information on Michelmore and the secret of his dead man's switch, and bribes her into aiding in his escape from the country. That night, Mace finds Andi attempting to abort the dead man's switch, and trails her to her home the next morning. Sneaking inside, Mace discovers that Andi is an agent of Michelmore. Back at his own home, Mace expresses admiration to Andi for being able to fool even him. As Andi shoots and kills a passing Stu, Mace pulls a hidden gun from beneath the kitchen sink and shoots her, but is wounded himself in the process. In his last act of clarity, Mace sets off the dead man's switch and calls to report Andi's dead body, but finds that he is unable to remember his own name.

Cast
Patrick Stewart as Mace Sowell
Kimberly Williams as Andi Travers
Héctor Elizondo as Dr. Simon
Joy Kilpatrick as Michelle Sowell-Ross
Craig Shoemaker as Stuart Bittenbinder
James Harlow as Marc Ross
Richard Livingston as Admiral Thomas Michelmore
Julia Vera as Teresa
Brenda Klemme as Asthma Girl Interviewee
Robert Lee Barry as Rocket Scientist Interviewee
Scott Zacky as Wise Guy Interviewee
Wayne Demaline as Butch the Redneck Interviewee
Hank Garrett as Hitman/Postman

References

External links
 
 
 

1998 independent films
1990s spy thriller films
American independent films
American spy thriller films
Films about Alzheimer's disease
Films scored by Kevin Kiner
Showtime (TV network) films
1998 films
Films directed by Eric Steven Stahl
1990s English-language films
1990s American films

ru:Бастион (фильм)